Il Vicolo (foaled 27 October 1991) was a New Zealand Standardbred racehorse. He is notable in that he won two New Zealand Trotting Cup races, the richest harness race, and sometimes the richest horse race in New Zealand.

As 1995 Harness Horse of the Year, he featured on a New Zealand postage stamp. Il Vicolo had already had some memorable victories to his credit including the New Zealand Derby-Great Northern Derby double and the New South Wales Derby. Il Vicolo won the New Zealand Trotting Cup – Air New Zealand Free For All double. He went on to win the NZ Cup a second time in 1996.

Major races
He won the following major races:
 1996 New Zealand Trotting Cup (Handicapped by 10 metres)
 1995 Great Northern Derby
 1995 New Zealand Trotting Cup
 1995 New Zealand Trotting Derby
 1994 New Zealand Sires Stakes 3yo Final

See also
 Harness racing in New Zealand

References

External links
 Il Vicolo in the 1996 NZ Cup 
 Il Vicolo in the 1995 NZ Cup

Racehorses bred in New Zealand
Racehorses trained in New Zealand
New Zealand standardbred racehorses
Harness racing in New Zealand
New Zealand Trotting Cup winners
1991 racehorse births